The Kiss is the third studio album by gospel group, Trin-i-tee 5:7. Featuring production by PAJAM, "Uncle Freddie" Jerkins and Myron Butler, "musically, The Kiss is urban contemporary/neo-soul with hip-hop elements, but lyrically", the album "is gospel". Described as "promoting Christianity" in a non-"divisive" manner, the album features lyrical input from the group themselves.

A critical success, the album also fared well commercially, peaking at number two on the US Billboard Top Gospel Albums, number three on the Top Christian Albums chart, number fifteen on the Top R&B/Hip-Hop Albums chart and number eighty-five on the Billboard 200.

Reception

Critical

The Kiss received positive reviews from critics. Alex Henderson of Allmusic praised the "vocal power" of the group, commenting that they could "hold their own against most of urban contemporary's secular female vocal groups". Henderson also compared The Kiss, musically, to the works of "secular female vocal groups" such as "Destiny's Child, Brownstone, En Vogue" and "TLC", in that it "is urban contemporary/neo-soul with hip-hop elements", but was keen to stress that "it does combine an urban contemporary/neo-soul groove with a gospel message". Henderson also commended "the expressive singers" for not being "in-your-face" or "divisive" about explaining "why Christianity works for them", going on to describe The Kiss as "a pleasing example of how Christian-oriented lyrics can be relevant to 21st century R&B". Anne Adams of Cross Rhythms gave a particularly favorable review of The Kiss. Rating the album ten-out-of-ten, Adams noted “Holla” (which she described as "infectious"), “Dance Like Sunday”, “People Get Ready”, “The One For Me” and “All Of My Life” as being "standout songs".

Commercial
The Kiss proved to be Trin-i-tee 5:7's greatest commercial success on the US albums charts. It became the group's first album to chart within the top 100 half of the Billboard 200, peaking at eighty-five. Considerably more successful on the Billboard component charts, the album also became Trin-i-tee's highest charting on the Billboard Top R&B/Hip-Hop Albums chart, where it peaked at number fifteen. Though peaking at number two on the Billboard Top Gospel Albums chart, it failed, however, to match the success of the group's self-titled debut album which topped the chart in 1998. The album was also a success on the Top Christian Albums chart, where it peaked at number three.

Track listing

Notes
"People Get Ready" is a cover of the same-titled Curtis Mayfield song - originally recorded by The Impressions.
"Lord" is based on and heavily interpolates "Love" by Musiq Soulchild.

Chart positions

References

Trin-i-tee 5:7 albums
2002 albums